Kafr Fo is a Syrian village in the Tartus District in Tartus Governorate. According to the Syria Central Bureau of Statistics (CBS), Kafr Fo had a population of 2,213 in the 2004 census.

References

Alawite communities in Syria
Populated places in Tartus District